St Marnarck also known as Manaccus was a bishop who became the patron saint of Lanreath. According to William Worcester his body lay in the church of Lanreath. He is commemorated in one of the stained glass windows of St Neot parish church. His feast day is 3 August.

See also

 Mannacus

References

Year of birth unknown
Medieval Cornish saints
British monks
6th-century Christian saints
6th-century English people
6th-century Christian monks
6th-century English clergy